Antonio Barrera de Irimo (10 May 1929 – 24 September 2014) was a Spanish politician who served as Minister of Finance of Spain between 1973 and 1974 and as Second Deputy Prime Minister in 1974, during the Francoist dictatorship.

References

1929 births
2014 deaths
Economy and finance ministers of Spain
Deputy Prime Ministers of Spain
Government ministers during the Francoist dictatorship